Jamos Parsa with the name of Sports Farshid Talebi (born 24 August 1981) is an Iranian Singer and retired professional football player.

Club career
He served most his career in Zob Ahan and played six seasons at the club. He was in the List of the candidates for 2010 Asian Player of the Year nominees, and then made it to the final five nominees for the coveted award but award was given to Saša Ognenovski. In 2012, he joined Sepahan with a three years contract but his contract was terminated on 1 July 2013. He moved to Tractor Sazi with a one-year contract.

Club career statistics
Last update: 14 July 2014 

 Assist Goals

International career
In June 2009, Talebi was invited under Afshin Ghotbi for three matches in 2010 World Cup qualifying, but did not play in any of them.

Honours

Club
Zob Ahan
Asian Champions League
Runner-up (1): 2010
Iran Pro League
Runner up (2): 2008–09, 2009–10
Hazfi Cup (1): 2008–09

Sepahan
Hazfi Cup (1): 2012–13

Tractor Sazi
Hazfi Cup (1): 2013–14

External links

1981 births
Living people
Iranian footballers
Iran international footballers
Fajr Sepasi players
Sepahan S.C. footballers
Zob Ahan Esfahan F.C. players
Tractor S.C. players
2011 AFC Asian Cup players
People from Shiraz
Association football defenders
People from Qaem Shahr
Sportspeople from Mazandaran province